Daniel H. Lennon (January 5, 1908 – October 4, 2002) was an American football and track and field coach. He served as the head football coach at the South Dakota School of Mines in 1946. Lennon was the head track coach at his alma mater, the University of South Dakota, from 1949 to 1975.

Head coaching record

Football

References

External links
 

1908 births
2002 deaths
South Dakota Coyotes football coaches
South Dakota Coyotes football players
South Dakota Mines Hardrockers football coaches
College track and field coaches in the United States
High school football coaches in South Dakota
People from Vermillion, South Dakota
Players of American football from South Dakota